Abigail Pereira Ávila (born 27 January 1986) is a Uruguayan artist, actress, vedette, singer, and dancer.

Biography
She was on the cover of the magazine Semanario in 2007.

A trans woman activist for LGBT rights, in 2007, Pereira managed to change her name on her identity card and passport. In 2013 her birth certificate was rectified in the Civil Registry, where many changes like this are not accepted. In 2009 she suffered a health breakdown.

Currently working for the Telemundo network and residing in Miami, United States, Pereira became the first trans Uruguayan to have permanent resident by extraordinary ability documents as a woman in the United States.

In 2012, she became a spokesperson in ads for the Uruguayan Consular Card (TCU). Pereira was a contestant on Telemundo's Yo Soy El Artista in 2014, and in 2015, she appeared in the Brazilian film Neon Bull.

Television
 2007, Bailando por un sueño
 2007–2008, El show del mediodía
 2014, Yo Soy El Artista
 Suelta la sopa
 2017, Algo contigo
 2023, El hotel de los famosos (season 2)

References

External links
 
 

1986 births
21st-century Uruguayan actresses
Uruguayan LGBT rights activists
Living people
Transgender actresses
Transgender women musicians
Uruguayan expatriates in the United States
Uruguayan female dancers
Uruguayan vedettes
Uruguayan LGBT actors
Uruguayan transgender people
LGBT Hispanic and Latino American people
People with acquired American citizenship
21st-century Uruguayan LGBT people
Uruguayan LGBT singers